"A Girl Like You" is a song by the American alternative rock group The Smithereens. It is the first single released in support of their third album 11.

The song was to be used in the film Say Anything..., but it was ultimately cut from the film because the producers believed the song revealed too much of the story. Backing vocals on the song were provided by Maria Vidal.

Background
Frontman Pat DiNizio attributed the song's harder guitar sound to new producer Ed Stasium: "[The album had] a heavier guitar sound, like in "A Girl Like You". We were trying to preserve our integrity, yet find a home on radio", lead singer Pat DiNizio said.

"A Girl Like You" was written by DiNizio on assignment for Cameron Crowe's film Say Anything.... DiNizio based the lyrics on bits of dialogue in the screenplay. When the film's producer asked DiNizio to change the lyrics, because it revealed too much of the plot, he refused, and the band decided to keep the song for their next album, 11. Pat DiNizio stated that he wrote the lyrics with a separate meaning from the movie in mind.

Madonna was originally enlisted to sing the harmony vocals, but failed to show up for the recording session. Instead, the band got Maria Vidal to do the vocals.

Release
"A Girl Like You" was released as the first single from the band's third album, 11. The track peaked at No. 2 on Billboard's Mainstream Rock chart and at No. 3 on the magazine's Modern Rock chart. It became the band's first Top 40 entry on the Billboard Hot 100, peaking at No. 38 and spending 20 weeks on the chart.

In popular culture
On May 18, 2010, the song was made available as a downloadable song in the Rock Band digital store.

Formats and track listing 
All songs written by Pat DiNizio, except where noted.
UK 7" single (ENV 15)
"A Girl Like You" – 4:38
"Cut Flowers" (Jim Babjak, Pat DiNizio) – 2:56

UK 12" single (12ENV 15)
"A Girl Like You" – 4:38
"Someone in Love" – 3:54
"Cut Flowers" (Jim Babjak, Pat DiNizio) – 2:56

Charts

References

External links 
 

1989 songs
1989 singles
The Smithereens songs
Song recordings produced by Ed Stasium
Songs written by Pat DiNizio
Enigma Records singles
American power pop songs